Anne Hathaway is an American actress. She made her acting debut in the short-lived television drama series Get Real (19992000) before starring in her breakthrough role of Mia Thermopolis in the successful Disney comedy The Princess Diaries (2001). It established her as a teen idol and she later reprised the role in its sequel, Royal Engagement. The following year, Hathaway made her New York stage debut in the Encores! production of Carnival!. This was followed by a string of family films such as Nicholas Nickleby (2002) and Ella Enchanted (2004), which were box office flops. In 2005, she transitioned to more mature roles with the acclaimed romance Brokeback Mountain. In 2006, Hathaway starred opposite Meryl Streep in the highly successful comedy-drama The Devil Wears Prada and portrayed Jane Austen in the biographical drama Becoming Jane the following year.

Hathaway received critical acclaim and a nomination for the Academy Award for Best Actress for playing a recovering alcoholic in Rachel Getting Married (2008). She played Viola in The Public Theater's 2009 production of Twelfth Night, which garnered her a Drama Desk Award for Outstanding Actress in a Play. In 2010, she won a Primetime Emmy Award for Outstanding Voice-Over Performance for providing her voice for an episode on The Simpsons. The same year, she played the White Queen in Tim Burton's $1 billion grossing fantasy adventure Alice in Wonderland. For her role as a free-spirited artist in Love & Other Drugs (2010), she earned a Golden Globe Award nomination for Best Actress – Motion Picture Comedy or Musical. During this period, Hathaway also starred in a number of other box-office hits such as Get Smart (2008), Bride Wars (2009) and Valentine's Day (2010). She then went on to voice a Spix's macaw named Jewel in the animated comedy adventure film Rio (2011) and its sequel Rio 2 (2014).

Another big commercial success came in 2012 with Christopher Nolan's superhero film The Dark Knight Rises, which grossed over $1 billion worldwide, in which she played Selina Kyle. The same year, her performance as Fantine in Tom Hooper's epic musical Les Misérables garnered her widespread acclaim and won her the Academy Award for Best Supporting Actress. In 2014, she starred as a NASA scientist in Nolan's Interstellar, and she earned a Drama League Award for Distinguished Performance nomination for her performance as a fighter pilot in the play Grounded (2015). Hathaway later had starring roles in the commercially successful comedies The Intern (2015), Ocean's 8 (2018), and The Hustle (2019).

Film

Stage

Television

Discography 
Charted songs

For her songs in Ella Enchanted, see: Ella Enchanted (soundtrack)

Guest appearances

See also
 List of awards and nominations received by Anne Hathaway

References

External links
 
 
 

Actress filmographies
American filmographies